Istvan Bors (Hungarian: Bors István) is a 1939 Hungarian comedy film directed by Viktor Bánky and starring Antal Páger, József Bihari and Klári Tolnay. It is based on a 1938 play by Sándor Hunyady, and was screened at the Venice Film Festival. The following year it was remade as an Italian film Big Shoes starring Amedeo Nazzari.

The film's sets were designed by the art directors József Pán and József Simoncsics.

Main cast
 Antal Páger as Bors István 
 József Bihari  as János 
 Klári Tolnay as Ilonka
 László Dévényi  as Parasztfiú 
 László Földényi  as Ügyvéd 
 Margit Ladomerszky  as Kálmán felesége 
 Béla Mihályffi  as Tulogdy Kálmán
 Ferenc Pethes as Prakszi 
 Sándor Pethes as Ügyvédbojtár 
 Lajos Boray  as Tiszttartó 
  Endre C. Turáni  as Paraszt 
 Olga Eszenyi  as Kati 
 Béla Fáy as Võlegény

References

Bibliography
 Judson Rozenblit. Constructing Nationalities in East Central Europe. Berghahn Books, 2005.

External links

1939 films
1930s Hungarian-language films
Films directed by Viktor Bánky
1939 comedy films
Hungarian comedy films